Ivan Wakit (born 10 April 1974) is a Papua New Guinean Olympic middle-distance runner and hurdler. He represented his country in the men's 400 metres hurdles at the 1996 Summer Olympics, as well as in the men's 4 × 400 metres relay. His time was a 53.42 in the hurdles, and his team's time was a 3:19.92 in the relay.

References

External links

1974 births
Living people
People from the Autonomous Region of Bougainville
Papua New Guinean male hurdlers
Olympic athletes of Papua New Guinea
Athletes (track and field) at the 1996 Summer Olympics
World Athletics Championships athletes for Papua New Guinea